Mike Riley may refer to:

Mike Riley (American football) (born 1953), American football coach
Mike Riley (referee) (born 1964), English football referee
Mike Riley (musician) (1904–1984), American trombonist
Mike Riley (curler) (born c. 1946), Canadian curler
Mike Riley (cartoonist) (born 1975), American comic book creator

See also
Mike Reilly (disambiguation)
Michael Riley (disambiguation)